Tommaso d'Aquino, C.R. (10 September 1657 – 15 October 1732) was a Roman Catholic prelate who served as Bishop of Vico Equense (1700–1732).

Biography
Tommaso d'Aquino was born in Caramanico Terme, Italy on 10 September 1657 and ordained a priest in the Congregation of Clerics Regular of the Divine Providence. On 21 June 1700, he was appointed during the papacy of Pope Innocent XII as Bishop of Vico Equense. On 24 June 1700, he was consecrated bishop by Pier Matteo Petrucci, Cardinal-Priest of San Marcello, with Gerolamo Ventimiglia, Bishop of Lipari, and Domenico Belisario de Bellis, Bishop of Molfetta, serving as co-consecrators. He served as Bishop of Vico Equense until his death on 15 October 1732.

References

External links and additional sources
 (for Chronology of Bishops) 
 (for Chronology of Bishops)  

18th-century Italian Roman Catholic bishops
Bishops appointed by Pope Innocent XII
1657 births
1732 deaths
Theatine bishops